Jackeline Estévez (born February 7, 1963) is a female singer in the Dominican Republic. She was born in San Francisco de Macoris, Dominican Republic. She has been performing for more than 27 years and recently won the 2008 Casandra Award for best female artist.

References

External links
Official Site

Living people
21st-century Dominican Republic women singers
1968 births
20th-century Dominican Republic women singers